The Battle of Roncesvalles (25 July 1813) was a battle between French and Anglo-Portuguese forces during the Peninsular War (1808–1814).

Background
After the decisive victory of Allied forces under Arthur Wellesley, 1st Duke of Wellington over French forces under King Joseph Bonaparte at the Battle of Vitoria, Wellington advanced to capture San Sebastián and Pamplona, the last French outposts on Spanish soil.

While Wellington concentrated his efforts on capturing the strategically important port of San Sebastián, he sent 11,000 men under the Irish-Spanish General O'Donnell to blockade Pamplona. To prevent a French counter-attack over the Pyrenees Wellington positioned General Hill's Corps over a  front, to cover the coastal road and the main passes over the mountains.

Battle
Having rapidly rebuilt and reorganised his forces after their defeat, the French under Marshal Nicolas Jean de Dieu Soult launched an attack towards Pamplona through the passes of Maya and Roncesvalles.

The French force at Roncesvalles consisted of 40,000 men and 8 mountain guns under Generals Reille and Clausel. The pass was defended by the British 4th Division commanded by Major-General Galbraith Lowry Cole and was helped by the Portuguese 4/10 brigade.

The French attacked from Saint-Jean-Pied-de-Port advancing in two columns either side of the pass. Clausel on the Altobiscar and Reille on the Linduz. At around 06:00 the two armies met. The British were badly outnumbered, John Byng's brigade on the eastern side held Bertrand Clausel's division at bay for three hours before being forced back.

By 14:00 Cole brought up three more brigades as reinforcements. However, around 17:00 a dense fog descended over the battlefield, just as the Portuguese 4/10 brigade repelled French attacks in the Val de Baigorry. Cole, despite orders to the contrary, ordered his troops to retreat towards Pamplona.

Aftermath
The Allied forces regrouped and made a stand near the village of Sorauren at the Battle of Sorauren two days later. Later, Wellington admitted that splitting his forces to besiege both San Sebastián and Pamplona simultaneously had been "one of the greatest faults he ever committed in war".

Colonel Walter O'Hara, who had fought in the battle, would name Roncesvalles Avenue in Toronto after the battle. The Roncesvalles, Toronto, neighbourhood in turn gained its name from the street.

References

Further reading

External links
 

Battle of Roncesvalles (1813)
Battles of the Peninsular War
Battles involving France
Battles involving the United Kingdom
Battles involving Portugal
Battle of Roncesvalles (1813)
July 1813 events
Roncesvalles